José María Morelos is one of the eleven municipalities that make up the Mexican state of Quintana Roo.

Geography

Like most of the Yucatan Peninsula José María Morelos is entirely flat with a gentle slope towards the sea, so from west to east.

Like the rest of the peninsula's surface the land has a limestone base that does not allow the formation of surface water flows such as rivers and streams, the water instead form flows in underground rivers that sometimes rise to the surface in cenotes. Lakes and cenotes are the major bodies of water in the municipality.

Communities

There were 129 populated localities, as well as 132 unpopulated localities enumerated during the 2010 census.

The largest localities (cities, towns, and villages) are:

Demographics

References

External links
 

Municipalities of Quintana Roo